Kaltanėnai is a town in Švenčionys district municipality, Vilnius County, east Lithuania. According to the Lithuanian census of 2011, the town has a population of 204 people. The town has a Catholic church.

History
In July 1941, an Einsatzgruppen of Lithuanian collaborators murdered the local Jewish population in several mass executions.

References

Towns in Vilnius County
Towns in Lithuania
Sventsyansky Uyezd
Holocaust locations in Lithuania